Solid Air is the fourth studio album by Scottish folk singer-songwriter John Martyn, released in February 1973 by Island Records.

Background
The album was recorded over eight days and features instrumental contributions by bassist Danny Thompson and members of Fairport Convention. "Solid Air", the title track, was dedicated to a friend of Martyn's, Nick Drake, who would die of an antidepressant overdose 18 months after the album was released. Martyn said of the track "It was done for a friend of mine, and it was done right with very clear motives, and I'm very pleased with it, for varying reasons. It has got a very simple message, but you'll have to work that one out for yourself." The album features an avant-garde cover of Skip James' "Devil Got My Woman", here retitled "I'd Rather Be the Devil" and performed with heavy use of Martyn's Echoplex tape delay effect.

"May You Never" became something of a signature song for Martyn, becoming a staple of his live performances. Released in November 1971 as a single in an early form, the song was re-recorded during the Solid Air sessions. Eric Clapton covered "May You Never" on his 1977 album Slowhand. In 2006, Martyn performed the album live in its entirety as part of the All Tomorrow's Parties-curated Don't Look Back series and subsequently toured the UK.

A remastered CD was issued by Universal Records in October 2000. This CD was packaged in a card slipcase, and featured a remastered version of the original album with the addition of a live version of "I'd Rather Be The Devil". Solid Air was given a further remastering and repackaging when a double CD reissue curated by John Hillarby was released in 2009, and which included several alternate studio and live versions.

The album cover is an example of schlieren photography demonstrating the 'solid' nature of air.

Reception

Contemporary reviews were favourable, with music weekly Sounds  declaring that "Solid Air flows beautifully and shows the entire spectrum of music that John Martyn has at his fingertips." In a retrospective review, American Songwriter described the album as "timeless" and stated that "audacious, hypnotic and groundbreaking only begins to describe Martyn’s still unique combination of folk, jazz, blues and space rock, wrapped around riveting, unforgettable melodies." AllMusic called Solid Air "one of the defining moments of British folk" and noted its genre-blending. BBC Music stated that "it's a classic with not a note out of place.. And ably assisted by John Wood's late night production it's now firmly esconced in the hearts of chillers, smokers and music lovers the world over."

Solid Air was rated as the 67th Greatest British Album Ever by the British music magazine Q, and was also included in their list of Best Chill-Out Albums Of All Time. The album is included in the book 1001 Albums You Must Hear Before You Die by Robert Dimery. It was voted number 826 in Colin Larkin's All Time Top 1000 Albums 3rd Edition (2000).

Track listing
All tracks written by John Martyn except where noted.

Side one
 "Solid Air" – 5:45
 "Over the Hill" – 2:53
 "Don't Want to Know" – 3:02
 "I'd Rather Be the Devil" (Skip James) – 6:18

Side two
 "Go Down Easy" – 3:35
 "Dreams by the Sea" – 3:17
 "May You Never" – 3:41
 "The Man in the Station" – 2:53
 "The Easy Blues" – 3:20

Note: On the original 1987 CD release of the album, the final track "The Easy Blues" was split into two separate tracks, "Jelly Roll Blues" (2:15) and "Gentle Blues" (1:07). The 2000 remastered reissue lists the track as "The Easy Blues (Jelly Roll Blues/Gentle Blues)", and the 2009 deluxe edition lists it as "The Easy Blues/Gentle Blues".

2000 remastered reissue bonus track
<li>"I'd Rather Be the Devil" (live) (Skip James) – 6:11

2009 Deluxe Edition
Disc 1

As original album.

Disc 2
"Solid Air" (alternative take) – 5:48
"Over the Hill" (alternative take) – 3:28
"Don't Want to Know" (alternative take) – 3:26
"I'd Rather Be the Devil" (alternative take) (Skip James) – 7:39
"Go Down Easy" (alternative take) – 4:55
"Dreams by the Sea" (alternative take) – 3:22
"May You Never" (alternative take) – 3:33
"The Man in the Station" (alternative take) – 5:32
"The Easy Blues/Gentle Blues" (alternative take) – 4:49
"Keep On" – 4:57
"When It's Dark" – 8:36
"In the Evening" – 4:04
"May You Never" (single version) – 2:43
"The Easy Blues" (live) – 3:24
"May You Never" (live) – 3:39
"I'd Rather Be the Devil" (live) (Skip James) – 8:33

Personnel
 John Martyn – vocals, acoustic and electric guitar; keyboards on "The Easy Blues"
 Richard Thompson – mandolin on "Over the Hill"
 Simon Nicol – autoharp on "Over the Hill"
 Sue Draheim – violin on "Over the Hill"
 Tony Coe – saxophone on "Dreams by the Sea" and "Solid Air"
 John "Rabbit" Bundrick – acoustic and electric piano, organ, clavinet
 Tristan Fry – vibraphone on "Solid Air"
 Danny Thompson – acoustic bass
 Dave Pegg – bass
 Dave Mattacks – drums
 Neemoi "Speedy" Acquaye – congas

Technical 
 John Wood – engineer
 Fabio Nicoli – sleeve design
 John Webster – front cover photography

References

External links
The Official John Martyn Website

John Martyn albums
1973 albums
Albums produced by John Wood (record producer)
Island Records albums